Karabo Tshepe (born 27 January 1989) is a South African soccer player who plays as a midfielder for South African Premier Division side TS Galaxy.

Career
He left Black Leopards in the summer of 2020 upon the expiry of his contract, and later signed for TS Galaxy.

References

Living people
1989 births
People from Randfontein
Soccer players from Gauteng
South African soccer players
Association football midfielders
Black Leopards F.C. players
Magesi F.C. players
TS Galaxy F.C. players
South African Premier Division players
National First Division players